Wiktoria Vendela Johansson (born 8 November 1996), known professionally as Wiktoria, is a Swedish singer and songwriter. She first achieved public attention during Melodifestivalen 2016, where she placed fourth.

Life and career
Johansson was born on 8 November 1996 in Brämhult, a suburb of Borås. In 2011, she participated in Lilla Melodifestivalen and placed fourth with the self-penned song "Jag behöver dig". On 30 November 2015, Johansson was announced as one of the 28 participants in Melodifestivalen 2016 with the song "Save Me".

She performed last in the second semi-final held on 13 February 2016, and qualified directly to the final. In the final, Johansson placed fourth with the juries, second with the Swedish public, and fourth overall. Johansson also voices Moana in the Swedish dub of the 2016 film Moana. She competed in Melodifestivalen 2017 with the song "As I Lay Me Down", qualifying once again directly to the final, where she finished sixth overall; eight with the juries, and second with the public. She was the Swedish spokesperson in the Eurovision Song Contest 2017, and toured with the Diggiloo Tour (in Swedish: Diggilooturnén), during the summer. She participated in Stjärnornas stjärna broadcast on TV4 in 2018, where she finished in fifth place out of eight contestants. She participated in Melodifestivalen 2019 with the song "Not with Me", qualifying directly to the final for the third time, where she finished sixth overall; sixth with the juries and eighth with the public.

On 30 April 2021, Wiktoria released "Need You to Know" and announced the forthcoming released of her debut album, which was released in June 2021. She returned to Melodifestivalen 2023 with the song "All My Life (Where Have You Been)" but fell within her heat, finishing fifth out of seven.

Discography

Studio albums

Singles

Notes

Filmography

References

External links 

Living people
Swedish women singers
Swedish pop singers
1996 births
People from Borås
Swedish songwriters
Swedish voice actresses
Swedish country singers
21st-century Swedish singers
21st-century Swedish women singers
Melodifestivalen contestants of 2023
Melodifestivalen contestants of 2019
Melodifestivalen contestants of 2017
Melodifestivalen contestants of 2016